Darryl Drake (December 11, 1956 – August 11, 2019) was an American football player and coach. His career spanned four decades, including stints as the wide receivers coach of the Chicago Bears, Arizona Cardinals, and Pittsburgh Steelers of the National Football League (NFL).

College career
Drake played wide receiver for Western Kentucky University from 1975 to 1978.

Professional career
Drake played wide receiver for three professional teams, the Washington Redskins in 1979, the Ottawa Rough Riders in 1981, and the Cincinnati Bengals in 1983.

Coaching career
Drake coached at the collegiate level for 21 years.  He joined the Chicago Bears coaching staff on February 6, 2004. On January 17, 2013, Drake was not retained by new head coach Marc Trestman. He later spent five seasons with the Arizona Cardinals before joining the Pittsburgh Steelers in 2018.

Personal life
Drake and his wife, Sheila, had three daughters. He died on August 11, 2019, at the age of 62. The official cause of death is still to be determined.

References

External links
 

1956 births
2019 deaths
American football wide receivers
African-American players of Canadian football
Chicago Bears coaches
Georgia Bulldogs football coaches
Players of American football from Louisville, Kentucky
Sportspeople from Louisville, Kentucky
Texas Longhorns football coaches
Arizona Cardinals coaches
Pittsburgh Steelers coaches
Western Kentucky Hilltoppers football coaches
Baylor Bears football coaches
Washington Redskins players
Ottawa Rough Riders players
Cincinnati Bengals players
20th-century African-American sportspeople
21st-century African-American people